Frankhauser is a German language habitational surname for someone from any of several places named Frankenhausen.  Notable people with the name include:

 Barry L. Frankhauser, Australian archaeologist
 Jenny Frankhauser (born 1992), German reality TV participant and singer
 Roy Frankhauser (1939–2009), American Nazi Party member
 William H. Frankhauser (1863–1921), Michigan republican

References 

German-language surnames
German toponymic surnames